Kiss the Sun Goodbye is the first full-length studio album from Vampires Everywhere!. The album was released on May 17, 2011 via Century Media and Hollywood Waste Records. It is the last album to feature David Darko, Jay Killa, and Alexander Rogue.

Reception
The album received mostly mixed reviews. The album ranked on Place 19th at the Billboard Top Hard Rock Albums and on Place 43 on Top Independent Albums (Billboard).

Track listing

Personnel
Michael Vampire - vocals 
David Darko - drums
Jay Killa - keyboards
Alexander Rogue - bass guitar
Aaron Graves - guitar
Zak Night - guitar
Wil Francis - guest vocals on "Bleeding Rain"

References

2011 debut albums
Vampires Everywhere! albums